Guinglo-Tahouaké is a town in western Ivory Coast. It is a sub-prefecture of Bangolo Department in Guémon Region, Montagnes District.

Guinglo-Tahouaké was a commune until March 2012, when it became one of 1126 communes nationwide that were abolished.

In 2014, the population of the sub-prefecture of Guinglo-Tahouaké was 36,368.

Villages
The 4 villages of the sub-prefecture of Guinglo-Tahouaké and their population in 2014 are:
 Bangolo-Tahouaké (8 590)
 Guézon-Tahouaké (8 824)
 Guinglo-Tahouaké (18 067)
 Zétrozon (887)

Notes

Sub-prefectures of Guémon
Former communes of Ivory Coast